Orikhove is a village in Sievierodonetsk Raion (district) in Luhansk Oblast of eastern Ukraine, at about 25 km WNW from the centre of Luhansk.

History
The settlement was formerly in Popasna Raion.

Demographics
The settlement had 621 inhabitants in 2001. Native languages spoken, according to the Ukrainian Census of 2001, are:
Ukrainian — 88.57%
Russian — 11.43%

References

Villages in Sievierodonetsk Raion